Man Hunt (original title: Cane arrabbiato) is a 1985 Western drama film directed by Fabrizio De Angelis and starring Ethan Wayne, Henry Silva, Bo Svenson, and Ernest Borgnine.

Plot
Wayne plays a nameless cowboy in modern-day Arizona who buys two horses at a fair but who is then arrested for theft because he failed to get the papers which would prove his ownership. He's sentenced to prison but escapes and begins a desperate search to find the man who sold him the horses.

External links
 
 

1985 films
1985 Western (genre) films
English-language Italian films
Spaghetti Western films
Films set in 1985
Films set in Arizona
Films directed by Fabrizio De Angelis
Films scored by Francesco De Masi
Neo-Western films
1985 drama films
1980s English-language films
1980s Italian films